Charles Julius Perry (20 October 1888 – 4 January 1961) was an Australian rules footballer who played with Norwood in the SAFL, and a Methodist Chaplain who served in the First AIF.

Family
The son of Isaiah Perry (1854-1911), and Caroline Marie Paulina Perry (1869-1956), née Roediger, Charles Julius Perry was born in Terowie, South Australia on 20 October 1888. His brother, Sir Frank Tennyson Perry (1887-1965) was a South Australian industrialist and member of parliament.

He married Florence Muriel Day (1985-1973) on 16 September 1920.

Football

Norwood (SAFL)
Perry, commonly known as "Redwing" due to his red hair, appeared in 58 games for Norwood and would have played more had World War I not interrupted his career. A Methodist minister, Perry finished equal first in a three way tie for the 1915 Magarey Medal count before having to settle for second after the umpires conferred to split the leaders as per the rules at the time. He was however posthumously awarded a retrospective Medal in 1998.

Training Units team (AIF)
He was captain of the Combined Training Units team in the AIF exhibition match which was played in London in 1916.

Military service
Enlisting on 1 March 1916, he served in Europe as a chaplain during World War I, and was involved in the AIF exhibition match which was played in London in 1916, captaining the Combined Training Units team. A news film was taken at the match. 

On 24 January 1919, Lieutenant-Colonel H. D. K. Macartney, the Officer Commanding of the 3rd Australian Divisional Artillery recommended that Perry be awarded an Officer of the Order of the British Empire: "During the period Sept.17th to Decr.31st 1918, Chaplain-Major PERRY has been Chaplain to the 8th Aust.F.A.Brigade [viz., Australian Field Artillery Brigade]. His duties have always been carried out in a thoroughly cheerful and tactful manner, and throughout the rapid advance, leading up to the cessation of hostilities, his gallant bearing and unselfish devotion to duty, generally under adverse conditions, have materially assisted the administration of this Unit. He has been a splendid example to both Officers and men. [Signed] H.D.K. Macartney, Lieut-Colonel. Commander, 3rd. Aust. Div. Artillery.". There is no indication within the records at the Australian War Memorial as to whether the Officer of the Order of the British Empire was ever awarded to Perry as Macartney had recommended.

After the war he returned to Norwood but only played briefly before retiring in 1920.

He continued to serve in the Methodist clergy and, also, served as vice-chairman of the Norwood Football Club.

See also
 1916 Pioneer Exhibition Game

Footnotes

References
 Photograph at Charles Julius Perry, at Virtual War Memorial Australia. 
 Pioneer Exhibition Game Australian Football: in aid of British and French Red Cross Societies: 3rd Australian Division v. Australian Training Units at Queen's Club, West Kensington, on Saturday, October 28th, 1916, at 3pm, Wightman & Co., (London), 1919.
 Richardson, N. (2016), The Game of Their Lives, Pan Macmillan Australia: Sydney. 
 National Archives of Australia: World War I Service record: Charles Julius Perry
Wheaton, C., "Preachers and Their Pastimes: Rev C. J. Perry - - Footballer", The Australian Christian Commonwealth, (Friday, 5 July 1929), p.4.
 Military Forces of the Commonwealth: Appointments, Promotions, etc.: 4th Military District: Chaplains' Department, Commonwealth of Australia Gazette,  No.99, (Saturday, 28 August 1915), p.1681: Appointment of Charles Julius Perry as Chaplain, 4th Class (effective date 1 August 1915).
 First World War Embarkation Roll: Chaplain 4th Class Charles Julius Perry, collection of the Australian War Memorial.
 First World War Nominal Roll: Chaplain Charles Julius Perry, collection of the Australian War Memorial.
 First World War Service Record: Chaplain-Major Charles Julius Perry, National Archives of Australia.

External links
 

Norwood Football Club players
Magarey Medal winners
Australian military chaplains
Australian Methodist ministers
1888 births
1961 deaths
Australian rules footballers from South Australia
World War I chaplains
Participants in "Pioneer Exhibition Game" (London, 28 October 1916)
Australian military personnel of World War I
People from Terowie, South Australia
Military personnel from South Australia